Getting Out is a 1978 play by American playwright Marsha Norman.

Getting Out may also refer to:

 Getting Out, a 1994 TV film adaptation of Norman's play, with Rebecca De Mornay and Robert Knepper
 "Getting Out", 21st episode of the 6th season of the American television series Judging Amy
 "Getting Out", 10th episode of the 3rd season of the British television series Within These Walls